is a Japanese publishing company and a subsidiary of the SoftBank telecommunications company. It was founded in 1999 and is headquartered in Tokyo, Japan.

Publications 
Young Adult
 
 Original Japanese language publication of the Math Girls series.

Light novel imprints 
GA Bunko
GA Novel

External links
SB Creative's publishing information website 
SB Creative's company website

Book publishing companies in Tokyo
Magazine publishing companies in Tokyo
SoftBank Group
Publishing companies established in 1999
Japanese companies established in 1999
Internet technology companies of Japan